Chloropterus versicolor is a species of beetle in the leaf beetle family, subfamily Eumolpinae. It is distributed in Ukraine, southern European Russia, Turkey, Azerbaijan, Kazakhstan and Turkmenistan. It was first described as Heterocnemis versicolor by Ferdinand Morawitz in 1860.

References

Eumolpinae
Beetles described in 1860
Beetles of Europe
Beetles of Asia